The chrotta, was a musical instrument played in Ireland, whose exact description is contested.

According to Irish historian Gratton Flood, it was a small harp played with a bow.  The instrument could be rested on knees or on a table.

Flood notes that the historian Gerbert had described the chrotta as an oblong instrument with six strings, four of which on a fingerboard and two off of it.

Historian Carl Engel noted that a 6th-century CE Italian writer, Venantius Fortunatus, had mentioned the "Chrotta Britanna" in a poem, but did not mention any bow.

See also
Crwth, a similar Welsh instrument

References

Bowed lyres
Irish musical instruments
Early musical instruments
Lost and extinct musical instruments